This is a list of the Permanent Representatives of Moldova to the United Nations. Permanent Representative is a head of the permanent mission of Moldova to the United Nations. The current office holder is Gheorghe Leucǎ, since 18 November 2021.

List 
 Tudor Panțîru (1992—1996)
 Ion Botnaru (1998—2002)
 Vsevolod Grigore (2003–2006)
 Alexei Tulbure (2006–2008)
 Alexandru Cujba (2008–2012)
 Vlad Lupan (2012–2017)
 Victor Moraru (2017–2021)
 Gheorghe Leucă (2021–present)

See also 
 Moldova and the United Nations
 Permanent Representative of Romania to the United Nations

References 

 
United Nations
Moldova